Religious texts, including scripture, are texts which various religions consider to be of central importance to their religious tradition. They differ from literature by being a compilation or discussion of beliefs, mythologies, ritual practices, commandments or laws, ethical conduct, spiritual aspirations, and for creating or fostering a religious community.

Authority of religious texts
The relative authority of religious texts develops over time and is derived from the ratification, enforcement, and its use across generations. Some religious texts are accepted or categorized as canonical, some non-canonical, and others extracanonical, semi-canonical, deutero-canonical, pre-canonical or post-canonical.

"Scripture" (or "scriptures") is a subset of religious texts considered to be "especially authoritative", revered and "holy writ", "sacred, canonical", or of "supreme authority, special status" to a religious community. The terms sacred text and religious text are not necessarily interchangeable in that some religious texts are believed to be sacred because of the belief in some theistic religions such as the Abrahamic religions that the text is divinely or supernaturally revealed or divinely inspired, or in non-theistic religions such as some Indian religions they are considered to be the central tenets of their eternal Dharma. Many religious texts, in contrast, are simply narratives or discussions pertaining to the general themes, interpretations, practices, or important figures of the specific religion. In others (Christianity), the canonical texts include a particular text (Bible) but is "an unsettled question", according to Eugene Nida. In yet others (Hinduism, Buddhism), there "has never been a definitive canon". While the term scripture is derived from the Latin scriptura, meaning "writing", most sacred scriptures of the world's major religions were originally a part of their oral tradition, and were "passed down through memorization from generation to generation until they were finally committed to writing", according to the Encyclopaedia Britannica.

Religious texts also serve a ceremonial and liturgical role, particularly in relation to sacred time, the liturgical year, the divine efficacy and subsequent holy service; in a more general sense, its performance.

Etymology and nomenclature
According to Peter Beal, the term scripture – derived from "scriptura" (Latin)  – meant "writings [manuscripts] in general" prior to the medieval era, then became "reserved to denote the texts of the Old and New Testaments of the Bible". Beyond Christianity, according to the Oxford World Encyclopedia, the term "scripture" has referred to a text accepted to contain the "sacred writings of a religion", while The Concise Oxford Dictionary of World Religions states it refers to a text "having [religious] authority and often collected into an accepted canon". In modern times, this equation of the written word with religious texts is particular to the English language, and is not retained in most other languages, which usually add an adjective like "sacred" to denote religious texts.

Some religious texts are categorized as canonical, some non-canonical, and others extracanonical, semi-canonical, deutero-canonical, pre-canonical or post-canonical. The term "canon" is derived from the Greek word "κανών", "a cane used as a measuring instrument". It connotes the sense of "measure, standard, norm, rule". In the modern usage, a religious canon refers to a "catalogue of sacred scriptures" that is broadly accepted to "contain and agree with the rule or canon of a particular faith", states Juan Widow. The related terms such as "non-canonical", "extracanonical", "deuterocanonical" and others presume and are derived from "canon". These derived terms differentiate a corpus of religious texts from the "canonical" literature. At its root, this differentiation reflects the sects and conflicts that developed and branched off over time, the competitive "acceptance" of a common minimum over time and the "rejection" of interpretations, beliefs, rules or practices by one group of another related socio-religious group. The earliest reference to the term "canon" in the context of "a collection of sacred Scripture" is traceable to the 4th-century CE. The early references, such as the Synod of Laodicea, mention both the terms "canonical" and "non-canonical" in the context of religious texts.

History of religious texts 

One of the oldest known religious texts is the Kesh Temple Hymn of ancient Sumer, a set of inscribed clay tablets which scholars typically date around 2600 BCE. The Epic of Gilgamesh from Sumer, although only considered by some scholars as a religious text, has origins as early as 2150 BCE, and stands as one of the earliest literary works that includes various mythological figures and themes of interaction with the divine. The Rigveda, a scripture of Hinduism, is dated 1500 BCE. It is one of the oldest known complete religious texts that has survived into the modern age.

There are many possible dates given to the first writings which can be connected to Talmudic and Biblical traditions, the earliest of which is found in scribal documentation of the 8th century BCE, followed by administrative documentation from temples of the 5th and 6th centuries BCE, with another common date being the 2nd century BCE. Although a significant text in the history of religious text because of its widespread use among religious denominations and its continued use throughout history, the texts of the Abrahamic traditions are a good example of the lack of certainty surrounding dates and definitions of religious texts.

High rates of mass production and distribution of religious texts did not begin until the invention of the printing press in 1440, before which all religious texts were hand written copies, of which there were relatively limited quantities in circulation.

See also 
 List of religious texts

References

Further reading 

 The British Library: Discovering Sacred Texts

External links 

 
Text